Metricon is a home building company in Australia. The company was established in Caulfield, Melbourne in 1976 to build homes, develop land, sell house and land packages and construct commercial buildings. Metricon currently runs its operation from its headquarters in Mt Waverley, Melbourne. Metricon also builds in New South Wales, Queensland and South Australia, with a head office existing in each of these states, as well as display homes. Metricon is currently owned by Mario Biasin and Ross Palazzesi.

Since 2016, for six years running, Metricon has been named at number one on the Housing Industry Association (HIA) Housing Top 100 list, a list that ranks Australia’s largest 100 residential builders by the number of homes commenced each year. In 2021, it topped the list with 6,052 site starts, including 5,820 detached homes and 232 semi-detached homes, this was a 22% increase on the previous year's 4,534 site starts. Victoria is Metricon's biggest state by site starts, with 3,974 starts in 2020/2021, while second place Queensland had 1,981 starts.

In 2011, Metricon won the naming rights to Metricon Stadium in the Gold Coast, Queensland, the home stadium for the Gold Coast Suns Football Club. The stadium was also the main venue for the 2018 Commonwealth Games. 

Metricon also has strong partnerships with charities such as Canteen and Habitat for Humanity.

Sources 
  Metricon website
 "HIA reveals Australia's Top Home Builders for 2020/2021" HIA
 "Metricon announced as naming rights partner" metriconstadium.com.au

Construction and civil engineering companies of Australia
Companies based in Melbourne
Construction and civil engineering companies established in 1976
1976 establishments in Australia
Australian companies established in 1976